Hello Cleveland may refer to:

 Hello, Cleveland! Live From The Metro, a live album by the band Cracker
 Hello Cleveland!, an independent record label in Australia
 Hello Cleveland, a band from West Chester, Pennsylvania.